This list may include memorials but does not include plaques or historical markers.

This is a sortable table. Click on the heading you want it sorted by.

References

African-American people
Monuments and memorials to victims of slavery in the United States
African-American monuments and memorials
Lists of African-American people
Sculptures of African Americans